El Gamil (also called Gamil or El Gamīl; Romanized Arabic: Ṭâbiyet el-Gamîl) is a fortress with an airfield in Port Said Governorate, Egypt. It was the landing site of British paratroopers in the 1956 Suez Crisis.

Suez Crisis
The capture of the airfield at El Gamil and the surrounding area was an essential element in Operation Musketeer, the joint Anglo-French airborne and amphibious assault on Port Said, with the ultimate aim of gaining control of the Suez Canal. The French 2nd Colonial Parachute Regiment were to land at Er Raswa while the 3rd Battalion, Parachute Regiment, part of 16th Independent Parachute Brigade, were tasked with the attack on El Gamil, which would be the first British battalion parachute assault since World War II and the last to date. At the insistence of French commanders, the airborne assaults on El Gamil and Raswa were to take place a full 24 hours before the arrival of the seaborne element, in order to preserve the element of surprise, as it would be difficult to conceal the approach of the large invasion fleet.

Order of Battle
British Army
Brigade Tactical HQ, 16th Independent Parachute Brigade, Brigadier M A H Butler, MC
3rd Battalion, Parachute Regiment, Lieutenant Colonel Paul Edwin Crooke, CBE DSO MA
"A" Company, Major Michael J. H. Walsh
"B" Company, Major Stevens
"C" Company, Major Ronald Norman
"D" Company
Forward Observation Officer (FOO) Detachment, 97 Battery (Lawson's Company) Royal Artillery, 33 (Para) Field Regiment, Royal Artillery
3 Troop, 9 Independent Parachute Field Squadron, Royal Engineers
Detachment, 16th Independent Parachute Brigade Signal Squadron, Royal Signals
Detachment, 23 Parachute Field Ambulance, Royal Army Medical Corps
Detachment, Parachute Platoon, 63 Company, Royal Army Service Corps
13 Air Contact Team, Royal Air Force
Detachment, Brigade RAF Parachute Detachment

Egyptian Army
One battalion group comprising:
One company covering the airfield with 2 x medium machine guns (MMG) in pillboxes
One company holding the adjacent cemetery with 3 x MMG, 1x 6 pounder anti-tank gun and 4 x 81 mm mortars
One company holding a coastguard barracks
Supported by 3 x SU-100 tank destroyers, 2 x 3.7 inch anti-aircraft guns
National Guard paramilitaries in the nearby town

References

See also
Suez Crisis

Buildings and structures in Port Said Governorate
Airports in Egypt
Castles in Egypt
Suez Crisis